Cam Ranh International Airport  is located on Cam Ranh Bay in Cam Ranh, a town in Khánh Hòa Province in Vietnam.
This airport handled 9,747,172 passengers in 2019, making it the fourth busiest airport in Vietnam, after the ones in Ho Chi Minh City, Hanoi and Da Nang, and one of the fastest growing airports in the country. 

This is the only airport in Vietnam that handles more international passengers than domestic passengers, with international passengers accounting for 70% in 2018. It is the fourth busiest airport in Vietnam.

Cam Ranh Terminal 1 is used for domestic flights and Cam Ranh Terminal 2 (managed by Cam Ranh International Terminal (CRTC) JSC) is used for international flights.

History

Cam Ranh Air Base 

Cam Ranh Airport was built by the United States Navy during the Vietnam War, and operated by the United States Air Force for military purposes as Cam Ranh Air Base.

In 1972, the base was turned over to the South Vietnamese government. On 3 April 1975, North Vietnamese forces captured Cam Ranh Bay and all of its remaining facilities. From 1979 to 2002, the facility was used by the Soviet and then Russian Air Force because of a 25-year rent-free leasing treaty.

Cam Ranh Airport 

On 19 May 2004, after major reconstruction, the airport received its first commercial flight from Hanoi. It now handles all of Nha Trang's commercial flights, which previously headed to Nha Trang Airport. In 2007, Cam Ranh was upgraded to an international airport. In December 2009, Cam Ranh International Airport was opened. The total invested capital is approximately VND 300 billion.

The International Terminal (T2) was officially put into operation on 30 June 2018 after 19 months of construction with a total investment capital of 3.735 billion. Developed and managed by Cam Ranh International Terminal (CRTC) Joint Stock Company, the T2 project came about at a time to inject much needed capacity into the airport operating infrastructure. At the same time, facilities and services were upgraded to match international standards.

Terminal 2 serves more than 80 flights per day at peak season, processing up to 14,500 passengers on a given busy day. CRTC has embarked on capacity enhancement works to further increase its handling capabilities to match to the phenomenal growths. In 2018, T2 serves 21 international airlines with a total of 5.2 million international passengers, the fourth largest airport in Vietnam in terms of international passenger volume.

Facilities

Runway 

Terminal 1
A new passenger terminal of Cam Ranh International Airport started construction in 2007 and was inaugurated on 12 December 2009. It has two aerobridges. The terminal was upgraded between 2015 and 2016, increasing its capacity from 1.5 million to 2.5 million passengers annually.

Terminal 2 
The terminal building has a unique architecture inspired by the shape of a swallow's nest, native to the Khanh Hoa Province, and the waves of Nha Trang Bay - a signature representation of the South Central Coast. T2 has 4 aerobridges and 10 boarding gates, as well as advanced equipment systems supplied by prestigious international companies.

Airlines and destinations 

Cam Ranh was the fourth busiest airport in Vietnam in 2012; it served 1.2 million passengers.

Statistics
Sources: Airport, ACV³

See also 

 List of airports in Vietnam

References

External links 

 

Airports in Vietnam
Buildings and structures in Khánh Hòa province
Cam Ranh
Airports established in 1965